Julio César Pinheiro García (born August 22, 1976 in Itapeva, São Paulo, Brazil) is a Brazilian former professional footballer who last played for Kyoto Purple Sanga in the J1 League. He also played for Atletico Celaya (his first team in Mexico) CF Monterrey, Cruz Azul, UNAM Pumas in Mexico CA Osasuna and CD Logrones in Spain. He is a Mexican naturalized citizen.

Club statistics

References

External links

 Profile

1976 births
Living people
Brazilian emigrants to Mexico
Brazilian footballers
Brazilian expatriate footballers
Mexican footballers
La Liga players
Segunda División players
CA Osasuna players
CD Logroñés footballers
Liga MX players
C.F. Monterrey players
Cruz Azul footballers
Kyoto Sanga FC players
J1 League players
Expatriate footballers in Mexico
Expatriate footballers in Japan
Naturalized citizens of Mexico
Association football midfielders